Socialist Left might refer to:

Socialist Left (Argentina)
Socialist Left (Australia), a faction of the Australian Labor Party
Socialist Left (Germany), a current in the Left Party
Socialist Left (France), a caucus of the French Socialist Party
Socialist Left (Peru)
Socialist Left (Quebec), a faction of Québec solidaire

Socialist Left might also refer to:

Socialist Left Party (Austria)
Socialist Left Party (Norway)